Ludlow Township may refer to the following townships in the United States:

 Ludlow Township, Champaign County, Illinois
 Ludlow Township, Allamakee County, Iowa
 Ludlow Township, Washington County, Ohio